The 2022–23 Brisbane Bullets season was the 37th season of the franchise in the National Basketball League (NBL).

On 25 November 2022, James Duncan was released as Bullets' head coach after the team started the season with a 3–6 record and was replaced by Sam Mackinnon on an interim basis. On 13 December 2022, Greg Vanderjagt was elevated to the Bullets' interim head coach. Ten days later, he was confirmed as the Bullets' head coach for the rest of the 2022–23 NBL season.

Roster

Standings

Ladder 

The NBL tie-breaker system as outlined in the NBL Rules and Regulations states that in the case of an identical win–loss record, the overall points percentage will determine order of seeding.

Ladder progression

Game log

Pre-season 

|-style="background:#BBF3BB;"
| 1
| 8 September
| @ Melbourne
| W 77–105
| Devondrick Walker (18)
| Harry Froling (9)
| D. J. Mitchell (6)
| Selkirk Stadium2,000
| 1–0
|-style="background:#BBF3BB;"
| 2
| 10 September
| @ Melbourne
| W 72–76
| Devondrick Walker (17)
| Gorjok Gak (9)
| Rasmus Bach (4)
| Casey Stadium1,500
| 2–0

NBL Blitz 

|-style="background:#BBF3BB;"
| 1
| 18 September
| New Zealand
| W 81–69
| Baynes, Johnson (14)
| Gorjok Gak (8)
| Gorjok Gak (6)
| Darwin Basketball Facility932
| 1–0
|-style="background:#BBF3BB;"
| 2
| 20 September
| @ Cairns
| W 76–77
| Devondrick Walker (16)
| Aron Baynes (9)
| Johnson, Walker (3)
| Darwin Basketball Facility660
| 2–0
|-style="background:#FFBBBB;"
| 3
| 23 September
| @ Melbourne
| L 80–67
| Tanner Krebs (21)
| Harry Froling (7)
| Bach, Johnson (3)
| Darwin Basketball Facility906
| 2–1

Regular season 

|-style="background:#FFBBBB;"
| 1
| 2 October
| @ Perth
| L 87–73
| Devondrick Walker (16)
| Aron Baynes (7)
| Jason Cadee (6)
| RAC Arena11,083
| 0–1
|-style="background:#FFBBBB;"
| 2
| 7 October
| @ Sydney
| L 100–90
| Baynes, Cadee (16)
| Aron Baynes (9)
| Tanner Krebs (5)
| Qudos Bank Arena11,478
| 0–2
|-style="background:#FFBBBB;"
| 3
| 9 October
| @ Tasmania
| L 90–86 (OT)
| Tyler Johnson (24)
| Aron Baynes (6)
| D. J. Mitchell (4)
| MyState Bank Arena4,231
| 0–3
|-style="background:#FFBBBB;"
| 4
| 16 October
| Sydney
| L 85–102
| D. J. Mitchell (20)
| D. J. Mitchell (10)
| Nathan Sobey (8)
| Nissan Arena4,797
| 0–4
|-style="background:#FFBBBB;"
| 5
| 22 October 
| @ S.E. Melbourne
| L 89–88
| Jason Cadee (21)
| Tyrell Harrison (8)
| Cadee, Sobey (5)
| John Cain Arena5,432
| 0–5
|-style="background:#BBF3BB;"
| 6
| 24 October
| @ Illawarra
| W 56–82
| Aron Baynes (17)
| Aron Baynes (14)
| Nathan Sobey (7)
| WIN Entertainment Centre2,011
| 1–5
|-style="background:#BBF3BB;"
| 7
| 27 October
| Illawarra
| W 86–61
| Nathan Sobey (22)
| Aron Baynes (14)
| Nathan Sobey (5)
| Nissan Arena2,583
| 2–5

|-style="background:#BBF3BB;"
| 8
| 5 November
| @ Tasmania
| W 72–74
| Aron Baynes (16)
| Baynes, Mitchell (9)
| Nathan Sobey (7)
| MyState Bank Arena4,231
| 3–5
|-style="background:#FFBBBB;"
| 9
| 19 November
| Cairns
| L 82–90
| D. J. Mitchell (21)
| Aron Baynes (11)
| Tyler Johnson (4)
| Nissan Arena4,401
| 3–6
|-style="background:#FFBBBB;"
| 10
| 27 November
| @ New Zealand
| L 116–79
| Tanner Krebs (19)
| Gorjok Gak (6)
| Nathan Sobey (10)
| Spark Arena3,660
| 3–7

|-style="background:#BBF3BB;"
| 11
| 1 December
| Perth
| W 106–95 (OT)
| Nathan Sobey (28)
| Harry Froling (13)
| Jason Cadee (8)
| Nissan Arena2,427
| 4–7
|-style="background:#FFBBBB;"
| 12
| 4 December
| Tasmania
| L 84–99
| Nathan Sobey (20)
| Gorjok Gak (9)
| Cadee, Sobey (5)
| Nissan Arena3,811
| 4–8
|-style="background:#FFBBBB;"
| 13
| 10 December
| @ Melbourne
| L 104–88
| Nathan Sobey (24)
| Gak, Mitchell (6)
| Jason Cadee (5)
| John Cain Arena5,788
| 4–9
|-style="background:#FFBBBB;"
| 14
| 14 December
| @ Cairns
| L 85–76
| Aron Baynes (17)
| Gorjok Gak (11)
| Jason Cadee (8)
| Cairns Convention Centre3,497
| 4–10
|-style="background:#FFBBBB;"
| 15
| 17 December
| @ Adelaide
| L 108–77
| Jason Cadee (18)
| Aron Baynes (11)
| Nathan Sobey (8)
| Adelaide Entertainment Centre6,003
| 4–11
|- style="background:#CCCCCC;"
| –
| 21 December
| New Zealand
| colspan="6" | Postponed (COVID-19) (Makeup date: 4 February)
|-style="background:#FFBBBB;"
| 16
| 21 December
| S.E. Melbourne
| L 77–104
| Nathan Sobey (31)
| Aron Baynes (8)
| Jason Cadee (7)
| Nissan Arena3,375
| 4–12
|-style="background:#BBF3BB;"
| 17
| 27 December
| Perth
| W 97–93 (OT)
| Nathan Sobey (30)
| Aron Baynes (10)
| Nathan Sobey (9)
| Nissan Arena3,737
| 5–12
|-style="background:#FFBBBB;"
| 18
| 29 December 
| @ Adelaide
| L 87–84
| Nathan Sobey (24)
| Aron Baynes (12)
| Cadee, Froling (3)
| Adelaide Entertainment Centre9,263
| 5–13

|-style="background:#FFBBBB;"
| 19
| 1 January
| Melbourne
| L 86–99
| Gorjok Gak (18)
| Gorjok Gak (13)
| Nathan Sobey (4)
| Nissan Arena4,781
| 5–14
|-style="background:#FFBBBB;"
| 20
| 5 January
| Cairns
| L 81–107
| Tyler Johnson (32)
| Gorjok Gak (7)
| Tyler Johnson (4)
| Nissan Arena4,258
| 5–15
|-style="background:#FFBBBB;"
| 21
| 11 January
| Sydney
| L 67–116
| Nathan Sobey (14)
| Aron Baynes (7)
| Jason Cadee (4)
| Nissan Arena4,068
| 5–16
|-style="background:#FFBBBB;"
| 22
| 14 January
| Melbourne
| L 91–101
| Aron Baynes (21)
| Aron Baynes (11)
| Nathan Sobey (6)
| Nissan Arena4,703
| 5–17
|-style="background:#BBF3BB;"
| 23
| 16 January
| @ S.E. Melbourne
| W 79–84
| Jason Cadee (28)
| Froling, Mitchell (5)
| Cadee, Froling, Mitchell (3)
| State Basketball Centre3,333
| 6–17
|-style="background:#BBF3BB;"
| 24
| 19 January
| Adelaide
| W 106–101 (OT)
| Tyler Johnson (27)
| Aron Baynes (11)
| Nathan Sobey (6)
| Nissan Arena3,953
| 7–17
|-style="background:#BBF3BB;"
| 25
| 21 January
| @ Illawarra
| W 86–103
| Tyler Johnson (23)
| Harry Froling (9)
| Nathan Sobey (6)
| WIN Entertainment Centre3,503
| 8–17
|-style="background:#FFBBBB;"
| 26
| 26 January
| New Zealand
| L 71–99
| Tyler Johnson (20)
| Baynes, Johnson, Sobey (5)
| Nathan Sobey (8)
| Nissan Arena3,636
| 8–18
|-style="background:#FFBBBB;"
| 27
| 28 January
| @ Cairns
| L 94–87
| Nathan Sobey (27)
| D. J. Mitchell (8)
| Tyler Johnson (7)
| Cairns Convention Centre4,437
| 8–19

|- style="background:#CCCCCC;"
| –
| 4 February
| S.E. Melbourne
| colspan="6" | Postponed (COVID-19) (Makeup date: 21 December)
|-style="background:#FFBBBB;"
| 28
| 4 February
| New Zealand
| L 75–80 (OT)
| Aron Baynes (17)
| D. J. Mitchell (8)
| Gorjok Gak (4)
| Nissan Arena5,253
| 8–20

Transactions

Re-signed

Additions

Subtractions

Awards

Club awards 
 Players Player: Tyler Johnson
 Members MVP: Tyler Johnson
 St Genevieve Partners Choice Award: Jason Cadee
 Defensive Player of the Year: Aron Baynes
 Youth Player of the Year: Matt Johns
 Narelle Kelly Award: Susannah Walmsley
 Club MVP: Nathan Sobey

See also 
 2022–23 NBL season
 Brisbane Bullets

References

External links 

 Official Website

Brisbane Bullets
Brisbane Bullets seasons
Brisbane Bullets season